Fettered is a 1919 British silent drama film directed by Arrigo Bocchi and starring Manora Thew, Hayford Hobbs and Fred Morgan. The film is based on a novel by Joan Sutherland.

Cast
 Manora Thew as Sheila Clavering  
 Hayford Hobbs as Lucien de Guise  
 Fred Morgan as Rocci  
 Charles Vane as General Clavering 
 Evelyn Harding as Lady Clavering  
 Bert Wynne as Harry Logan  
 Peggy Patterson as Monica Hewlett  
 George Butler as Captain Galveston  
 Ethel Royale as Lady Mortimer

References

Bibliography
 Low, Rachael. History of the British Film, 1918-1929. George Allen & Unwin, 1971.

External links

1919 films
1919 drama films
British silent feature films
British drama films
Films directed by Arrigo Bocchi
Films based on British novels
Ideal Film Company films
British black-and-white films
1910s English-language films
1910s British films
Silent drama films